Salchichón is a Spanish summer sausage that is made by smoking, drying, cooking or some combination. It is made with pork, although some recipes use other meats including ox, veal or horse.

Preparation

The meat and fat are chopped in thin bits, seasoned with salt, pepper, nutmeg, oregano, and garlic and then inserted in thick natural pork intestines. Curing can be done for up to three months.

Regional variations

In Puerto Rico, salchichón is a smoked summer sausage similar in some ways to Genoa salami, an unsmoked Italian dry sausage. The salami is made of beef liver, heart, tripe, and pork fat and meat. It is often seasoned with salt, vinegar, whole black peppercorns and smoked paprika.

See also
 Saucisson, a similar sausage from France

References

Further reading
Spanish Wikipedia Salchichón article, has much more detail

Spanish sausages
Puerto Rican cuisine